Bith may refer to:

 Bith (Celtic mythology), a character from Goidelic Celtic mythology
 Bith (Star Wars), an alien race in Star Wars